ROM DOS may refer to:

Datalight ROM-DOS, a ROMed version of DOS by Datalight since 1989
General Software Embedded DOS-ROM, a ROMed version of Embedded DOS by General Software since 1990
MS-ROMDOS, a ROMed version of MS-DOS by Microsoft

See also
ROM Operating System (ROS), a ROMed version of Digital Research's DR DOS since 1988
DOS Plus, a ROMable DOS
DR DOS, a ROMable DOS
PalmDOS, a ROMable DOS